The 2010 European Sevens Championship was a rugby sevens competition, with the final held in Moscow, Russia. It was the ninth edition of the European Sevens championship. The event was organised by rugby's European governing body, the FIRA – Association of European Rugby (FIRA-AER).

Final standings
These are the final standings of the tournament:

Results - Men 
Semi-Final Bowl
Moldova, 19 - Lithuania, 15
Netherlands, 17 - Poland, 15
Semi-Final Plate
Romania, 19 - Italy, 12
Georgia, 12 - Ukraine, 5
Semi-Final Cup
France, 19 - Russia, 5
Portugal, 17 - Spain, 12

match for place 11 
Lithuania, 21 - Poland, 7
match for place 9 (Bowl-Final)
Moldova, 21 - Netherlands, 12
match for place 7 
Ukraine, 24 - Italy, 17
match for place 5 (Plate-Final)
Georgia, 59 - Romania, 0
match for place 3
Russia, 22 - Spain, 10

Final: (Cup-Final)
Portugal, 12 - France, 5

References

External links
 Hannover sevens website 
 FIRA-AER official website

2010
International rugby union competitions hosted by Russia
European
2010–11 in European rugby union
2010 in Russian rugby union